Temur Sabirov was a renowned Soviet and Tajik Doctor of Physics and Mathematics.

Life 
Temur Sabirov was born on 3 April 1940 in Sufiyen, Tajikistan. He was the third youngest of six children. After his father passed away at an early age, he was sent to study at a boarding school. Sabirov's father was a government tax collector. His mother was a housewife. His siblings and relatives are also highly respected and have been involved in politics. His older brother is Bozor Sobir, Tajikistan's most well-known and preeminent poet, and politician. His older brother was also a mathematician and ran for a Senate seat. His nephew, also a mathematician, was the head of a Democratic Party in Tajikistan until his resignation in 2000s. His other siblings went into teaching.

Scientific career 
He completed his doctorate in Voronezh, Russia. He was a savant and one of the youngest recipients of a doctoral degree in Soviet Union. He was a student of Mark Krasnosel'skii, who was a Soviet, Russian and Ukrainian mathematician renowned for his work on nonlinear functional analysis and its applications. Temur Sobirov was a professor in Voronezh State University in Russia. His field of research was the theory of ordinary differential equations. His works have been published in Soviet as well as European and American mathematical and physics journals. He has published over 60 scientific articles. He has made a big contribution in the education of young scientists of Tajikistan.

Distinctions 
A government primary school as well as a street is named after him in Tajikistan.

Family 
He met his wife Nina while studying in Voronezh. He has one son Arthur Sobirov, who at the time of Sobirov's teaching at Voronezh State University attended the prestigious Suvorov Military School.

Death 
After an acute illness Sabirov died on June 23, 1977 at the age of 37 in Voronezh, but his body was transported to his birthplace near Orzhenikidzebad, now Vahdat, Tajikistan.

References

1942 births
1977 deaths
Voronezh State University alumni
Academic staff of Voronezh State University
Soviet mathematicians